Ashoka (died 232 BC) was a monarch of the Mauryan Empire of India.

Ashoka, Asoka, or Ashok may also refer to:

Entertainment
 Ashok (film), a 2006 Telugu film directed by Surender Reddy
 Ashoka (2006 film), a 2006 Kannada film directed by Shivamani
 Ashoka (2008 film), a 2008 Tamil film directed by Prem
 Asoka (1955 film), a 1955 Sri Lankan film directed by Sirisena Wimalaweera
 Aśoka (film), a 2001 Bollywood historical drama film directed by Santosh Sivan
 Ashoka the Great (book), a 2011 book by Wytze Keuning

People

Actors 
 Ashok Kumar (Tamil actor) (born 1981), South Indian actor and Bharatnatyam performer
 Ashok Kumar (1911–2001), Indian film actor
 Ashok Lokhande (born 1950), Indian film actor
 Ashok Mehta (1947–2012), Indian film actor
 Ashok Saraf (born 1947), Indian actor and comedian, Marathi and Hindi
 Ashok Selvan (born 1989), Indian actor
 Ashok Shinde, Indian film actor
 Ashok (Kannada actor) (born 1951), Kannada film actor

Chief Ministers of Indian states 

 Ashok Chavan (born 1958), Chief Minister of Maharashtra
 Ashok Gehlot (born 1951), chief minister of the Indian state of Rajasthan
 R. Ashok, former Deputy Chief Minister of Indian State of Karnataka

Cricketers 

 Ashok Upadhyay (born 1953), Indian cricketer
 Asoka de Silva (cricketer) (born 1956), Sri Lankan Sinhala cricketer

Film-related 

 Ashok Amritraj (born 1956), Indian American film producer
 Ashok Gaikwad (born 1962), Indian film director

Law and enforcement 

 Ashok Chaturvedi (born 1947), former chief of India's external intelligence agency
 Ashok Desai, Attorney General of India, 1996 to 1998
 Asoka de Silva (judge) (born 1946), Sri Lankan Sinhala judge, Chief Justice
 Ashok Kamte (1965–2008), Additional Commissioner of Mumbai Police for the East Region

Literature 

 Ashok Banker (born 1964), Indian novelist and short story writer
 Ashokamitran (1931–2017), influential figure in post-independent Tamil literature

Others 
 Ashoka (Gonandiya), a king of Kashmir
 Ashok Row Kavi (born 1947), Indian journalist and LGBT rights activists

Other uses
 Ashoka (non-profit organization), an international citizen sector organization
 Ashoknagar (disambiguation) or Ashok Nagar, the name of various places in India
 Ashok Leyland, an Indian commercial vehicle manufacturer founded in 1948 based in Chennai

See also
 Ashok Kumar (disambiguation)
 Ashoka tree (disambiguation)
 Ashokan (disambiguation)
 Asoka de Silva (disambiguation)
 Asok (disambiguation)
 Ahsoka Tano, a Star Wars character
 Ahsoka (TV series)